The Hellstrom Chronicle is an American film released in 1971 which combines elements of documentary, science fiction, horror and apocalyptic prophecy to present a gripping satirical depiction of the struggle for survival between humans and insects. It won the 1972 Academy Award for Best Documentary Feature. It was conceived and produced by David L. Wolper, directed by Walon Green and written by David Seltzer, who earned a Writers Guild of America Award nomination for his screenplay.

Plot
Fictitious scientist Dr. Nils Hellstrom (played by Lawrence Pressman) guides viewers throughout the film. He claims, on the basis of scientific-sounding theories, that insects will ultimately win the fight for survival on Earth because of their adaptability and ability to reproduce rapidly and that the human race will lose this fight largely because of excessive individualism. The film combines short clips from horror and science fiction movies with extraordinary camera sequences of butterflies, locusts, wasps, termites, ants, mayflies, other insects rarely seen before on film and insectivorous plants/insects.

Technical advisers Roy Snelling and Charles Hogue were entomologists at the Los Angeles County Museum of Natural History.

Cast
Lawrence Pressman - Dr. Nils Hellstrom

Reception
Rotten Tomatoes gave the film a 75% score based on reviews from 8 critics.

Green later called it "almost yellow-journally but good. We were giving the audience an elbow to the ribs every third line."

Awards
 1972 Academy Award for Best Documentary Feature
 1972 BAFTA Award - Best Documentary Feature

Home video
The film was released on DVD and Blu-ray January 10, 2012 from Olive Films.

See also 

 Phase IV
 Hellstrom's Hive
 Watership Down
 The Plague Dogs
 The Adventures of Chatran

References

External links
 The Hellstrom Chronicle at the David L. Wolper Co.
 
 New York Times review
 Review, Chicago Sun-Times by Roger Ebert
 Notes at Turner Classic Movies

1971 films
Best Documentary Feature Academy Award winners
American documentary films
Documentary films about insects
1971 documentary films
Films directed by Walon Green
The Wolper Organization films
Films scored by Lalo Schifrin
1970s English-language films
1970s American films